Neligan is a surname. Notable people with the surname include:

 David Neligan (1899–1983), "The Spy in the Castle"
 Dorinda Neligan (1833–1914), Irish-born English headmistress and suffragette
 Gwendoline Neligan (1905–1972), British fencer
 Moore Richard Neligan (1863–1922), Anglican Bishop
 Maurice Neligan (1937–2010), Irish heart surgeon, activist, newspaper columnist and media commentator
 Maurice Wilder-Neligan (1886–1923), born Maurice Neligan, British-born Australian soldier

Fictional characters
 John Hopley Neligan, a character in The Adventure of Black Peter, a Sherlock Holmes story by Sir Arthur Conan Doyle